Pandora is a female Mexican singing trio. The trio was formed in 1981 under the name Trebol by sisters Isabel Lascurain and Mayte Lascurain and their cousin Fernanda Meade. The trio was renamed "Pandora" upon signing with EMI Records in 1984.

Background
During their school years, the Lascurain sisters and some friends participated as a group in various music festivals, calling themselves "Las Jeans". Later, Fernanda Meade, their cousin, joined Isabel and Mayte to form a trio called "Trebol". Under this name they recorded an album for RCA Victor in 1981 entitled El día que me quieras (The Day That You Love Me).

From 1981 to 1984 the trio established itself doing backup vocals for artists such as Emmanuel and Pedro Vargas (who is the sisters' godfather), and backup vocals for the group Timbiriche. On November 29, 1984, the trio signed a record deal with EMI and became Mexico's first all-female musical trio in thirty years. The artistic director of EMI Capitol Mexico, Luis Moyano, renamed the group "Pandora" after the first woman created on Earth in Greek mythology.

In May 1989, Meade left the group to pursue a solo career and was replaced by Liliana Abaroa. Meade returned to the group in 1997 and has continued with them since.

Fame and legacy
Their signature song is a composition by singer-songwriter Hernaldo Zúñiga titled "¿Cómo te va mi amor?" (Eng.: "How have you been my love?") which was recently included on the VH1 countdown of the 100 Best Songs of the 80s in Spanish at number 16.

Pandora peaked at number one in the Billboard Hot Latin Tracks in 1993 with their rendition of "Without You", titled "Desde el Día Que Te Fuiste", taken from their cover album Ilegal. The album received a nomination for Pop Album at the Lo Nuestro Awards of 1993 and Pandora won for Pop Group of the Year. The following year, they appeared as guest artists on Plácido Domingo's Grammy-nominated album, De Mi Alma Latina.

Pandora's music can be classified as Latin Pop, though some of their later albums feature much more traditional Mexican composition. Pandora borrows heavily from other performers and songwriters. The trio has covered many songs of Juan Gabriel, Manuel Alejandro, and Hernaldo Zúñiga. These covers make up a large part of their performance repertoire.

After issuing Pandora Otra Vez in 1986, Fernanda Meade, Isabel Lascurian, and Mayte Lascurian had the opportunity to perform live in the U.S. while participating in a tribute to Plácido Domingo at Los Angeles' Universal Amphitheater, moving to Europe to make Huellas a year later. While touring America to promote Hace Tres Noches Apenas, a traditional Mexican music album, Pandora's live performance at Mexico City's Metropolitan Theater was recorded on May 8, 1998, released as Pandora 1985/1998.

To celebrate the 25th anniversary of their debut, the three original members of Pandora reunited in 2010 to release a new album, Pandora - De Plata, which consisted of covers, duets, and re-recordings of their old hits.

Discography
Studio albums
 Pandora (1985)
 Otra Vez (1986)
 Huellas (1987)
 Buenaventura (1988)
 999 Razones (1989)
 Con Amor Eterno (1991)
 Ilegal (1992)
 Con Amor Eterno Vol. II (1993)
 Confesiones (1995)
 Hace Tres Noches Apenas (1997)
 Vuelve a EstarConmigo (1999)
 En Carne Viva (2002)
 Por eso... Gracias (2004)
 De Plata (2010)
 En el Camino (2013)
 Pandora 30 (2015)
 Navidad con Pandora (2016)
 Más Pandora que nunca (2019)

Live albums
Pandora 1985/1998(1998)
En Acústico(2006)	
XXV Años En Vivo(2011)
Inesperado Tour (2022)

Awards

Grammy Awards

|-
|rowspan="1" scope="row"|1985
|scope="row"|"Cómo Te Va Mi Amor"
|scope="row"|Latin Pop Performance
|
|-
|rowspan="1" scope="row"|1992
|scope="row"|...Con Amor Eterno
|scope="row"|Latin Pop Album, Vocal or Instrumental
|
|-

Lo Nuestro Awards

|-
|rowspan="1" scope="row"|1990
|scope="row"|Pandora
|scope="row"|Pop Duo or Group
|
|-
|rowspan="1" scope="row"|1991
|scope="row"|Pandora
|scope="row"|Pop Duo or Group
|
|-
|rowspan="2" scope="row"|1992
|scope="row"|Con Amor Eterno
|scope="row"|Pop Album of the Year
|
|-
|scope="row"|Pandora
|scope="row"|Pop Duo or Group
|
|-
|rowspan="2" scope="row"|1993
|scope="row"|Ilegal
|scope="row"|Pop Album of the Year
|
|-
|scope="row"|Pandora
|scope="row"|Pop Duo or Group
|
|-
|rowspan="1" scope="row"|1994
|scope="row"|Pandora
|scope="row"|Pop Duo or Group
|
|-
|rowspan="1" scope="row"|1998
|scope="row"|Pandora
|scope="row"|Pop Duo or Group
|
|-

References

Mexican girl groups
Mexican women singers
Living people
Musical trios
Musical groups established in 1980
Sony Music Latin artists
Latin pop music groups
Year of birth missing (living people)
Women in Latin music